"MichiGO (미치Go)" is a single recorded by South Korean hip hop artist G-Dragon. It was released digitally on April 1, 2013, through Line. It's the first single from Coup d'Etat.

Background 
On March 15, YG Entertainment announced that G-Dragon will release a new single to support his first world tour. The single released exclusively through mobile app Line, it was first available only on South Korea, Japan and Thailand. The single was released worldwide on April 20 with the music video. The music video has a special appearances by Taeyang, SE7EN, and Teddy.

Commercial performance 
The song entered Gaon Music Chart after releasing of the album Coup d'Etat, It charted on the first week at number 22 with total sales 87,930 digital copies, on the second week it raised at number 17 with 72,036 sales. By the end of September, the single sold 235,165 copies.

Critical reception 
Billboard said that the track showed G-Dragon's charismatic delivery, and that he has a signature style that will is recognizable. The Music Video was chosen the third on Buzz Feed's 24 Of The Most Brilliant Music Videos From 2013, "G-Dragon is known for making the most flamboyant and weird videos in K-Pop, and this delightfully weird video is his best yet.".

Charts and sales

Sales

Release history

References

External links
 

2013 singles
2013 songs
Songs written by G-Dragon
G-Dragon songs
Songs written by T.O.P
YG Entertainment singles